The National High School of Mathematics and Natural Sciences "Academician Lyubomir Chakalov" (in Bulgarian: Национална природо-математическа гимназия "Академик Любомир Чакалов") is a high school (European secondary school) in Sofia, Bulgaria. It is located in Lozenets municipality. The school is named after the Bulgarian mathematician Lyubomir Chakalov. More than 1000 students are studying in the school. They are divided into seven majors:
 Mathematics and Computer science (52 students, 2 classes with German/English language studying)
 Physics (26 students, 1 class with English)
 Chemistry (52 students, 2 classes with German/English language)
 Chemistry and Biology (26 students, 1 class with English)
 Biology (26 students, 1 class with English)
 Earth Science (26 students, 1 class with English)
 Computer science (26 students, 1 class with English)

НПМГ Alumni Club 

НПМГ Alumni Club was established in 2017. Its mission is to create long-term connections between alumni of the gymnasium, as well as enrich the learning process of current students through lectures, workshops, and other academic and social events.

External links
Official site 
НПМГ Alumni Club Facebook page

Schools in Sofia
Educational institutions established in 1968